The Minister for Child Poverty Reduction is a ministerial position in the New Zealand Government responsible for overseeing and executing the Government's child poverty reduction strategy. The position was created upon the formation of the Sixth Labour Government and is currently held by Jan Tinetti.

Role and Responsibilities
During 2017 New Zealand election campaign, New Zealand Labour Party Leader Jacinda Ardern promised that a Labour government would introduce legislation to set the government a child poverty reduction target. Following the formation of the Labour-New Zealand First coalition government in October 2017 the position was created to introduce and execute Labour's child poverty reduction policy, and incoming Prime Minister Jacinda Ardern appointed herself to the post.

The portfolio is administered by the Department of the Prime Minister and Cabinet, and is responsible for coordinating and overseeing the Government's child poverty reduction strategy.

List of Ministers
Key

References

Workplace Relations and Safety
Public office-holders in New Zealand